The Jeep Willys2 is a concept car made by the Chrysler Group and presented at the 2001 Tokyo Auto Show. The Willys2 is based on the Willys MB and uses frame web technology and a one-piece carbon-fiber body. The design takes many design cues from other Jeep models, such as the seven-slot grille and trapezoidal wheel arches. Some elements of the design were later incorporated into the Jeep Liberty. The Willys2 weighs around 3000 pounds with its removable carbon-fiber top. Its powered by a 160-hp I4 engine, which accelerates it from 0 to 60 mph in 10 seconds, and onto a top speed of about 90 mph. The interior is all plastic, and it is possible to clean the interior by spraying it with water.

References

Willys2